Local elections were held in Sweden on 14 September 2014 to elect county councils and municipal councils. The elections were held alongside general elections.

Results

County councils
The total number of seats increased nationwide to 1,678, up from 1,662 in the 2010 elections.

Municipal elections

External links 
 Full results

Local and municipal elections in Sweden
2014 elections in Sweden
September 2014 events in Europe